Sers is a village in the Vayk Municipality of the Vayots Dzor Province of Armenia.

Etymology 
The village is also known as Ses.

History
The village was depopulated in 1604 during the rule of Abbas the Great of Persia. Later, in 1828, the Armenian population of the Salmas province of Persia emigrated and settled in the village.

References

External links 

Populated places in Vayots Dzor Province